John Anthony Mendez (born September 4, 1955) is a Senior United States district judge of the United States District Court for the Eastern District of California.

Early life and education

Mendez was born in Oakland, California in 1955 and raised in San Leandro, California. He received a Bachelor of Arts degree from Stanford University in 1977. He then obtained a Juris Doctor from Harvard Law School in 1980, where he was a member of the Board of Student Advisers.  An avid baseball fan, Mendez was once under consideration for the job of Major League Baseball commissioner.

Career

Mendez worked in private practice in California from 1980 to 1984 and from 1986 to 1992. Between 1984 and 1986, he served as an Assistant United States Attorney for the Northern District of California. From 1992 to 1993, he was the United States Attorney for the Northern District of California. In 1993, Mendez again returned to private practice. Mendez served as a judge on the Sacramento County Superior Court for the State of California between 2001 and 2008.

Federal judicial service

He was nominated by President George W. Bush on September 6, 2007, to a seat vacated by David F. Levi. He was confirmed by the United States Senate on April 10, 2008, and received his commission on April 17, 2008. He assumed senior status on April 17, 2022.

See also
List of Hispanic/Latino American jurists

References

External links

1955 births
Living people
Assistant United States Attorneys
California state court judges
Harvard Law School alumni
Hispanic and Latino American judges
Judges of the United States District Court for the Eastern District of California
Stanford University alumni
Superior court judges in the United States
United States Attorneys for the Northern District of California
United States district court judges appointed by George W. Bush
21st-century American judges
People from Oakland, California
People from San Leandro, California